Comparative religion is the systematic comparison of the doctrines and practices of the world's religions.

Comparative Religion may also refer to:
 Comparative Religion (book), a book by Frank Byron Jevons
 "Comparative Religion" (Community), an episode of American comedy television series Community

See also 
 Studies in Comparative Religion, an academic journal published from 1963 to 1987